Christine Harris (born 1958) is an Australian actress and producer, born and raised in South Australia. She is currently director of HIT Productions theatre touring company.

Career

After portraying a young version of popular Australian singer Julie Anthony in a television special, Harris moved to Sydney at the end of 1979 to star in the short-lived Network Ten series. Arcade as paraplegic Tina Marshall, who worked in her father's pinball parlour.

She followed this with appearing in Nine Network soap opera The Young Doctors as Dolly Davis, before moving to Melbourne to play the key role in the Crawford Productions series Carson's Law as Amy Carson (1983–84).

Subsequent roles included stints in  Prisoner in 1985-1986 as Pippa Reynolds, the daughter of the Prison Governor, in the ABC-TV mini series Darlings of the Gods as IGeorgia and Neighbours as Sylvie Latham. She also appeared in the motion picture Beyond My Reach.

Filmography

FILM

TELEVISION

HIT Productions

In 1997 Christine was named "Victorian Entrepreneur of the Year," for her efforts in establishing HIT Productions  however the company was liquidated in 2013 with debts totalling $1.8 million.

References

External links
 
 HIT Productions Touring Company

Australian soap opera actresses
1958 births
Living people
Actresses from South Australia
20th-century Australian actresses